Leste Chen (born 3 March 1981) is a Taiwanese film director, a screenwriter and sometimes a producer.

Filmography
The Heirloom (2005)
Eternal Summer (2006)
Love on Credit (2011)
HeartBeat Love (2012)
The Great Hypnotist (2014)
20 Once Again (2015)
Upcoming Summer (2021)
Battle of Memories (2017)
 Moonshine and Valentine (2018)

Accolades
Jury
2021 – 11th Beijing International Film Festival

References

External links 
 

Taiwanese film directors
1981 births
Living people